Henry Bernstein may refer to:

 Henri Bernstein (1876–1953), French playwright
 Henry Bernstein (sociologist), British sociologist
 Sir Henry Bernstein (died 1857), theologian, orientalist, Fellow of the Royal Society of Edinburgh

See also
Harry Bernstein (1910–2011), British-born American writer